The Silmarils are three brilliant jewels in J. R. R. Tolkien's fantasy fiction.

Silmaril may also refer to:
Silmarils (company), a French  computer game software company
Silmaril (horse), an American thoroughbred mare racehorse
The Silmarillion, a collection of J. R. R. Tolkien's mythopoeic works